Iulia Leorda is a Moldovan wrestler. She won the silver medal in the women's 53 kg event at the 2021 World Wrestling Championships held in Oslo, Norway. She is also a two-time bronze medalist at the European Wrestling Championships. She also competed at the 2010 Summer Youth Olympics in Singapore.

Career 

She won the silver medal in the girls' freestyle 46 kg event, losing to Yu Miyahara of Japan in the final.

In March 2021, she competed at the European Qualification Tournament in Budapest, Hungary hoping to qualify for the 2020 Summer Olympics in Tokyo, Japan.

In 2022, she won one of the bronze medals in the women's 53 kg event at the Yasar Dogu Tournament held in Istanbul, Turkey. In April 2022, she won one of the bronze medals in the women's 53 kg event at the European Wrestling Championships held in Budapest, Hungary. She competed in the women's 53kg event at the 2022 World Wrestling Championships held in Belgrade, Serbia.

References

External links 
 

Wrestlers at the 2010 Summer Youth Olympics
Moldovan female sport wrestlers
Living people
European Games competitors for Moldova
Wrestlers at the 2015 European Games
Year of birth missing (living people)
Wrestlers at the 2019 European Games
European Wrestling Championships medalists
World Wrestling Championships medalists
21st-century Moldovan women